"Workin' for a Livin'" is a single by American rock band Huey Lewis and the News, released in 1982. Included on their 1982 album Picture This, the song peaked at number 20 on the Billboard Mainstream Rock Tracks charts, and number 41 on the Billboard Hot 100. A live version appears as a B-side to the single "The Heart of Rock & Roll".

History
According to Huey Lewis, the song was a semi-autobiographical one about past jobs he had before he became a musician. Lewis had written it during his time as a truck driver. "I wrote it when I was actually working," Lewis said. "I thought about all of the jobs which just sort of popped out." Some of the jobs listed in the song (busboy and bartender) were also jobs Lewis had before becoming a musician.

The song was used in the 1988 film Big starring Tom Hanks. 

The 1992 Fox sitcom Rachel Gunn, R.N. used a version of the song sung by lead actress Christine Ebersole as its opening theme.

Later version
In 2007, Lewis recorded the song as a duet with country music singer Garth Brooks. This duet version is included on Brooks' 2007 album, The Ultimate Hits, and was released as a single. It is Lewis' first appearance on the Hot Country Songs chart, where the single reached the top 20.

Charts

Huey Lewis and the News version

Garth Brooks & Huey Lewis version

References

 

1982 songs
1982 singles
2008 singles
Huey Lewis and the News songs
Garth Brooks songs
Songs about labor
Songs written by Huey Lewis
Songs written by Chris Hayes (musician)
Song recordings produced by Allen Reynolds
Chrysalis Records singles
Big Machine Records singles
Male vocal duets